The Virvytė River or Virvyčia River (Samogitian: Virvītė) is a river in Samogitia (Šilalė, Telšiai and Mažeikiai districts), northwestern Lithuania. It is a left tributary of the Venta River. Virvytė begins in Žemaičiai Highlands, 3 km north from Laukuva town. It flows north passing Lakes Paršežeris and Lūkstas, Varniai city, Lake Biržulis, Tryškiai town. Virvytė flows into Venta near Gyvoliai village. Virvytė's main tributaries are Juodupis, Būgenis, Trimsėdis, Upyna, Tryškys.

References 

Rivers of Lithuania
Venta River basin